Sky News Arabia (stylised as Sky News عربية) is an Arabic 24-hour rolling news channel broadcast mainly in the Middle East and North Africa. It is a joint venture between UK-based Sky Group and Abu Dhabi Media Investment Corporation (ADMIC), owned by Mansour bin Zayed Al Nahyan, a member of the Abu Dhabi Emirate ruling family. The channel uses the Sky News brand and was launched on 6 May 2012.

The channel is based in Abu Dhabi's Two Four 54 media SEZ and has a network of bureaux across MENA, along with offices in London and Washington, DC. It also shares access to Sky News' wider international bureaux network.

History
BSkyB and Sheikh Mansour bin Zayed Al Nahyan first announced a 50/50 joint venture to operate a free-to-air Arabic-language all-news channel on 29 November 2010. Adrian Wells, head of international news at Sky News, was appointed to lead preparations to launch the channel.

In February 2011, Nart Bouran was hired as Sky News Arabia's first director of news. Bouran was previously director of television at Reuters. Yasser Thabet, former program director at the Saudi-owned Al Arabiya, joined Sky News Arabia as director of output in June 2011 and Nicholas Love was appointed as director of finance.

Al-Waleed bin Talal, the second-largest shareholder in 21st Century Fox, which at the time had a 39.1% stake in BSkyB, announced in September 2011 that he would launch another Arabic news channel, Al-Arab News Channel. The channel closed on the same day it launched.

Preparations at the network's headquarters in Two Four 54 (stylised as twofour54) media SEZ of Abu Dhabi, began in February 2012. It began broadcasting on 6 May 2012.

On 8 November 2015, Sky News Arabia launched its own radio station at 90.3 FM, which was originally the home of BBC World Service in Arabic. The radio station is live-anchored and broadcasts news, weather, sports, traffic and stock market updates and political discussions in randomized blocks. Specialized segments are created specifically for morning, early afternoon, and early evening hours. Several television programmes can also be heard as well.

Broadcasting
Sky News Arabia officially claims a commitment to independent reporting and avoiding partisan programming. A six-person editorial advisory committee is said to exercising oversight over the network's editorial output.

Sky News Arabia is broadcast to more than 50 million households in the MENA region on satellite and cable providers, as well as over the internet and mobile apps. It is available free-to-air on Nilesat 201, Arabsat, Hot Bird and Astra.

It is available in the United States, Canada, South America, Australia and New Zealand through myTV's platform. It is also available to watch on Sky channel 788 in the United Kingdom and Ireland, + on Virgin Media.

Facilities
Sky News Arabia's headquarters are located in Abu Dhabi's Two Four 54 (stylised as twofour54) media township. The technical integration process at the studio was carried out from April 2011 to February 2012 in collaboration with Television Systems Limited.

The facility consists of one large single studio which houses a number of permanent sets used for different programs. It also consists of a 10-meter wide video wall.

Controversy 
As the channel is jointly owned with Sheikh Mansour bin Zayed Al Nahyan, concerns were raised about its editorial independence initially when it launched as well as during later geopolitical events.

In 2017, during the Qatar diplomatic crisis, Sky News Arabia aired an Emirati-backed documentary that allegedly claimed Qatar's government was linked to al-Qaeda member Khalid Sheikh Mohammed. The official Qatar News Agency, which claimed to have been hacked prior to the diplomatic crisis, later assigned law firm Carter-Ruck to file a complaint to the British media regulator Ofcom against Sky News Arabia, alongside Al Arabiya, for "violating impartiality code and accuracy in news’ sourcing".

Following the assassination of Jamal Khashoggi, the channel broadcast pro-Saudi coverage which included reports, as well as statements from commentators, directed against Qatar and Turkey.

References

External links

 

2012 establishments in the United Arab Emirates
Television channels and stations established in 2012
Arab mass media
Arabic-language television stations
Mass media in Abu Dhabi
Sky News
State media